Verneda is a Barcelona Metro station in the Verneda neighbourhood of Sant Adrià de Besòs, a suburb of Barcelona. It's served by L2. It was opened in 1985, although it was part of L4 back then, until a major change in both lines took place in 2002 to ease transportation from Badalona to Barcelona. The platforms are 93 m. long.

Services

See also
List of Barcelona Metro stations

References

External links

TMB.net
Trenscat.com
Transportebcn.es

Barcelona Metro line 2 stations
Railway stations in Spain opened in 1985
Railway stations in Barcelonès
Transport in Sant Adrià de Besòs
1985 establishments in Spain